Wagons West is a 1952 American Western film directed by Ford Beebe and starring Rod Cameron, Noah Beery Jr., and Peggie Castle.

Plot

Cast
 Rod Cameron as Jeff Curtis
 Noah Beery Jr. as Arch Lawrence
 Peggie Castle as Ann Wilkins
 Michael Chapin as Ben Wilkins
 Henry Brandon as Clay Cook
 Sara Haden as Mrs. Elizabeth Cook
 Frank Ferguson as Cyrus Cook
 Anne Kimbell as Alice Lawrence
 Wheaton Chambers as Sam Wilkins
 Riley Hill as Gaylord Cook
 Effie Laird as Emma
 I. Stanford Jolley as Slocum
 Almira Sessions as Ada
 Harry Tyler as Old man

References

External links

1952 films
1952 Western (genre) films
American Western (genre) films
Films directed by Ford Beebe
Allied Artists films
Cinecolor films
1950s English-language films
1950s American films